Ramón Víctor Castro García (born 13 June 1964 in Montevideo) is a former Uruguayan footballer. Following his playing career, Castro became a football manager in Chile.

Club career
Castro spent most of his career in the Primera División Uruguaya, playing for Cerro, Montevideo Wanderers and Peñarol. He also had spells with Deportivo Mandiyú and Deportivo Español in the Primera División de Argentina.

International career
Castro made nine appearances for the senior Uruguay national football team from 1987 to 1991.

Post-retirement

References

External links
 

1964 births
Living people
Footballers from Montevideo
Uruguayan footballers
Uruguayan expatriate footballers
Uruguay international footballers
1991 Copa América players
Uruguayan Primera División players
C.A. Cerro players
Montevideo Wanderers F.C. players
Peñarol players
Liverpool F.C. (Montevideo) players
Argentine Primera División players
Deportivo Mandiyú footballers
Deportivo Español footballers
Chilean Primera División players
C.D. Antofagasta footballers
Rangers de Talca footballers
Primera B de Chile players
Cobresal footballers
Expatriate footballers in Argentina
Expatriate footballers in Chile
Uruguayan expatriate sportspeople in Argentina
Uruguayan expatriate sportspeople in Chile
Association football midfielders
Uruguayan football managers
Curicó Unido managers
Rangers de Talca managers
Chilean Primera División managers
Uruguayan expatriate football managers
Expatriate football managers in Chile
Uruguayan emigrants to Chile
Naturalized citizens of Chile